Juan Paul Watterson FCA CMgr FCMI FRSA SHK (born 1980) is a Manx politician, who is Speaker of the House of Keys, and a member for Rushen, in the Isle of Man.

Early life
Born in 1980 to John and Alison Watterson, he was educated at Rushen Infants School, Rushen Junior School and Castle Rushen High School.

Qualification and professional memberships
Watterson attended the University of Lincoln (University of Lincolnshire & Humberside) where he graduated in 2001 with a First Class BA (Hons) in Management. He joined international accountancy firm KPMG where he qualified as a Chartered Accountant in 2005. He was the ICAEW Chairman of the National Student Council, and later served on the institute's Young Professionals Advisory Board, Public Sector Advisory Board and Members and Commercial Board of the Institute as well as having been part of its 90-member governing ICAEW Council.

Career
Watterson was first elected to the House of Keys in 2006 aged 26 years 142 days, making him the second youngest ever elected MHK. He was appointed a political member of the Department of Local Government and the Environment and Chairman of the island's Planning Authority. Until May 2009, he had special responsibility as a "political member" for Housing (DoLGE) and Social Security within the Department of Health and Social Security (DHSS), these roles being the Manx equivalent of a junior minister in the UK. After 10 months as Chairman of the Planning Committee, he was appointed to the Department of Economic Development with special responsibility for the island's financial services sector.

He was re-elected in the 2011 General Election with 3,080 votes, the highest number of votes in the island, and the largest in Rushen since the 1986 boundary changes. He was appointed the Minister for Home Affairs, Chairman of the Communications Commission, and in 2012 became the island's first Armed Forces Champion. At 31 years 102 days, he became the youngest ever member of the Council of Ministers on his appointment as Minister for Home Affairs on 14 October 2011.

2006: elected to House of Keys with 2,430 votes.
2011: re-elected to the House of Keys, with 3,080 votes, the largest received by any candidate since 1981.
2011: appointed Minister for Home Affairs and Chairman of the Communications Commission.
2016: Chartered Manager and Fellow of the Chartered Management Institute.
2016: re-elected after boundary changes with 2,087 votes, the third largest total on the island.
2016: elected unopposed to the position of Speaker of the House of Keys.
2021: re-elected to the House of Keys with 2,384 votes, the largest total on the island, and re-elected unopposed as Speaker.

Watterson joined the Armed Forces Parliamentary Scheme where he is a postgraduate (2012) and Honorary Commander (RN). On 1 August 2016 he was appointed Hon. Colonel of the Isle of Man Army Cadet Force.

Election results

2006

2011

2016 
In 2014, Tynwald approved recommendations from the Boundary Review Commission which saw the reform of the island's electoral boundaries.

Under the new system, the island was divided into 12 constituencies based on population, with each area represented by two members of the House of Keys.

As a result of these changes the constituency was reduced in size and lost one of its three MHKs.

2021

Personal life
Watterson has been married to Helena (née Perry) since March 2010, they have a daughter and son together and live in Port St. Mary, Isle of Man.

In December 2011 he infamously vomited on a public bus after attending his Department's (Department of Home Affairs (Isle of Man)) Christmas party, shortly after giving a talk about a need for a "responsible attitude" towards drinking over the festive period. This was featured in a January 2012 edition of Private Eye, as a nominee of the "Don't Do What I Do, Do What I Say" Rotten Borough award. He later apologised for his "lapse of judgement" in "getting a little bit drunk".

Publications
Tynwaldballs and Tynwaldballs 2, two collections of quotes and gaffes from the Manx parliament.

References

1980 births
Alumni of the University of Lincoln
Living people
Members of the House of Keys 2011–2016
Members of the House of Keys 2016–2021